Belinda Bidwell (22 April 1936 – 28 April 2007) was the first female speaker of the National Assembly of The Gambia. In 2002, Bidwell, who was previously a teacher, was nominated to serve in the National Assembly, and she became deputy speaker. In April 2006, following an attempted coup d'etat in March, Speaker Sheriff Mustapha Dibba was arrested and removed from his position for alleged involvement, and Bidwell became speaker.

Bidwell died of a heart attack in April 2007. She was survived by her husband James Ndow, three sons and two daughters.

Early life
Bidwell was the second daughter of Gabriel and Julian Faal Faal Matilde, born on 22 April 1936. Her sister and father were politically active in Alliance for Patriotic Reorientation and Construction party. She had her primary education at Saint Joseph Convent, collegiate education at Gambia College and graduation at the University of Oxford in the UK. After completing education, she served as a teacher at St. Joseph Convent, St. Augustine Junior Secondary School and Gambia College. She had various degrees in Mathematics and environment protection from University of Chicago, US, University of Reading in the UK and at other universities in Australia, the Soviet Union and Germany. She was married to James Ndow and the pair had three sons and two daughters.

Political life
Bidwell was nominated to serve in the National Assembly in 2002 by Alliance for Patriotic Reorientation and Construction, and she went on to become the deputy speaker. In April 2006, following an attempted coup d'etat in March, Speaker Sheriff Mustapha Dibba was arrested and removed from his position for alleged involvement, and Bidwell became speaker. Fatoumatta Jahumpa Ceesay replaced Bidwell as speaker in February 2007, Bidwell died of a heart attack in April 2007.

References

Speakers of the National Assembly of the Gambia
1936 births
2007 deaths
Gambian Creole people
Gambian Christians
21st-century Gambian women politicians
21st-century Gambian politicians
Women legislative speakers
20th-century African-American people